Phil Rapp of Weatherford, Texas, is a cutting horse trainer, inductee in both the NCHA Rider Hall of Fame Open Division and Non-Pro Division, and the leading NCHA money earner with lifetime earnings totaling $9,214,410.45 as of January 2019. He was elected vice-president of the National Cutting Horse Association in 2016, and became president in June 2018.

References

Cutting (sport)
American horse trainers
NCHA Hall of Fame (members)
NCHA Hall of Fame (riders)
Living people
Year of birth missing (living people)